Anna Bastrikova (born 15 November 1985) is a retired Russian tennis player.

In her career, she won two singles and eight doubles titles on the ITF Women's Circuit. On 4 November 2002, she reached her career-high singles ranking of world No. 301. On 2 May 2005, she peaked at No. 201 in the doubles rankings.

Bastrikova made her WTA main-draw debut at the Tashkent Open in the doubles event partnering Yuliana Fedak.

ITF finals

Singles (2–6)

Doubles (8–9)

Junior Grand Slam finals

Girls' doubles

References

External links
 
 

1985 births
Living people
Tennis players from Moscow
Russian female tennis players
20th-century Russian women
21st-century Russian women